This is a list of members of the Landtag of North Rhine-Westphalia in the 2017–2022 legislature. The Landtag of North Rhine-Westphalia is legislature of the German state of North Rhine-Westphalia, and consists of 199 members. They are elected once every five years. The members in this list were elected in the 2017 election.

The government during this legislature was the Laschet cabinet, a coalition of the Christian Democratic Union (CDU), and Free Democratic Party (FDP).

Members of the Landtag

References

Lists of political office-holders in Germany
2017